Ajtai or Ajtay is a Hungarian surname. Notable people with the surname include:

 Andor Ajtay (1903–1975), Hungarian actor
 Miklós Ajtai (born 1946), Hungarian computer scientist and mathematician

Hungarian-language surnames